The Macfarlane Burnet Medal and Lecture is a biennial award given by the Australian Academy of Science to recognise outstanding scientific research in the biological sciences.

It was established in 1971 and honours the memory of the Nobel laureate Sir Frank Macfarlane Burnet, OM KBE MD FAA FRS, the Australian virologist best known for his contributions to immunology and is the academy's highest award for biological sciences.

Prizewinners
Source: Australian Academy of Science

See also 

 List of biochemistry awards
 List of biology awards
 List of prizes named after people

References

Australian science and technology awards
Awards established in 1971
Australian Academy of Science Awards
Biochemistry awards
Biology awards